Mohamed Fares Al Arnaout (born 31 January 1997) is a Syrian professional footballer who plays as a centre-back for Indian Super League club Goa.

Club career
Arnaout previously played for Al-Jazeera, Al-Jaish, Hutteen in Syria. He won the Syrian Cup, Syrian Premier League and Syrian Super Cup in his first season with Al-Jaish. In the years to come, he would establish himself as a key member of the squad – winning the Syrian League again the following season in 2018/19.

Arnaout joined Bahraini outfit Al-Muharraq and clinched the 2021 AFC Cup title. He later joined Manama Club in the same league.

Goa
In July 2022, Indian Super League outfit Goa completed the permanent signing of Arnaout on a one-year deal.

International career
On 8 July 2019, Arnaout made his international debut for Syria against North Korea in a 5–2 win in the 2019 Intercontinental Cup, where they achieved third place.

Arnaout captained the Syria U23 side to the quarter-finals of the 2020 AFC U-23 Championship. The tournament saw Syria brave the odds to qualify from a group that had Asian powerhouses in Saudi Arabia, Japan and Qatar. They eventually bowed out of the tournament in the quarter-finals, losing to Australia in extra time.

Career statistics

Club

International

Honours
Al-Jaish
 Syrian Premier League: 2017–18, 2018–19
 Syrian Cup: 2018
 Syrian Super Cup: 2018

Al-Muharraq
 AFC Cup: 2021
 Bahraini FA Cup: 2021

References

External links 

Fares Arnaout at Eurosport

Syria international footballers
Syrian expatriate sportspeople in India
FC Goa players
Al-Jaish Damascus players
Hutteen Latakia players
Al Jazira Club players
Al-Muharraq SC players
Manama Club players
Indian Super League players
Syrian footballers
Syrian expatriate footballers
Expatriate footballers in Bahrain
Expatriate footballers in India
Association football defenders
1997 births
Living people